The grey-headed broadbill (Smithornis sharpei) is a species of bird in the family Calyptomenidae.
It is found in Cameroon, Central African Republic, Republic of the Congo, Democratic Republic of the Congo, Equatorial Guinea, Gabon, and Nigeria. Its natural habitat is subtropical or tropical moist lowland forests.

References

grey-headed broadbill
Birds of the Gulf of Guinea
Birds of Central Africa
grey-headed broadbill
Taxonomy articles created by Polbot